This is a list of amusement park rides based on specific films or film franchises.

* - Has since closed in that particular location.

See also
List of amusement rides based on television franchises
List of IMAX-based rides
 List of amusement rides based on video games franchises

References

Amusement rides based on film franchises
Film franchises
Film franchises